"Everywhere" is a song by British-American rock band Fleetwood Mac from their 14th studio album, Tango in the Night (1987). The song was written by Christine McVie, who also performed lead vocals, and produced by Lindsey Buckingham and Richard Dashut. In the United States, "Everywhere" was released as the fourth single from Tango in the Night in November 1987, while in the United Kingdom, it was issued as the album's fifth single on 21 March 1988.

The single peaked at number 14 on the US Billboard Hot 100 and number one on the Adult Contemporary chart, remaining there for three weeks. In the United Kingdom, "Everywhere" peaked at number four on the UK Singles Chart and was certified triple platinum by the British Phonographic Industry (BPI) for sales and streams of over 1.8 million units. "Everywhere" also reached number one in Belgium and on the Canadian adult contemporary chart while becoming a top-10 hit in several other countries.

In March 2013, after being featured in an advertisement for UK mobile phone provider 3, "Everywhere" re-entered the UK Singles Chart, rising to number 15.

Background and release
In the 2019 BBC Four documentary, Fleetwood Mac's Songbird – Christine McVie, Richard Dashut, the co-producer of Tango in the Night, briefly talked about the intro: "That's a half-speed acoustic guitar and electric combined". McVie herself also talked about the song's intro: "He [Buckingham] slowed the tape down, really slowly, and played the parts slowly, and then when it came to the right speed, it sounded bloody amazing". An early version lacked harmonies Nicks had recorded, leading to a heated argument.

A twelve-inch single was issued which featured an extended dance version and dub version. "Everywhere" also marked the first CD single release by the band in most territories. All of the formats included the B-side "When I See You Again", a song taken from Tango in the Night; the 12-inch format featured an extended mix of "Everywhere" and the mini-CD single contained the bonus tracks "Rhiannon" and "Say You Love Me" from Fleetwood Mac's single-titled tenth studio album Fleetwood Mac (1975).

Reception
"Everywhere" has been widely acclaimed by music critics. Alexis Petridis at the Guardian dubbed it "peerless" and "bulletproof pop songwriting." Brad Nelson from Pitchfork claimed "Everywhere" to be the best song on Tango in the Night, writing that the tune "responds with warmth, empathy, and buoyancy, describing a kind of devotion so deeply felt that it produces weightlessness in a person." Elsewhere, the publication ranked it among the 200 Best Songs of the 1980s, praising its "carefully crafted, spare, and meticulously produced" sound.

Music videos
There are two versions of the music video for "Everywhere". One features members Christine McVie, John McVie, and Mick Fleetwood. The other video does not feature the band at all and is a visual depiction of the poem "The Highwayman" by Alfred Noyes.

Track listings

7-inch and cassette single
A. "Everywhere" (LP version) – 3:41
B. "When I See You Again" (LP version) – 3:47

12-inch single
A1. "Everywhere" (extended version) – 5:40
A2. "Everywhere" (LP version) – 3:48
B1. "Everywhere" (dub) – 3:50
B2. "When I See You Again"

Mini-CD single
 "Everywhere"
 "When I See You Again" (LP version)
 "Rhiannon"
 "Say You Love Me"

Personnel
 Christine McVie – lead and backing vocals
 Stevie Nicks – backing vocals
 Lindsey Buckingham − guitars, keyboards, Fairlight CMI synthesiser, backing vocals
 John McVie − bass guitar
 Mick Fleetwood – drums, percussion

Charts

Weekly charts

Year-end charts

Certifications

Moustache version

In 2005, "Everywhere" was covered by Australian musical duo Moustache (Michael Di Francesco and Richard Sanford), featuring singer Melinda Jackson on vocals. Released as a standalone single, this version peaked at number 19 on the Australian ARIA Singles Chart and number two on the ARIA Dance Chart in May 2005.

Track listing
Australian and New Zealand CD single
 "Everywhere" (radio edit) – 3:22
 "Everywhere" (Cabin Crew radio mix) – 3:26
 "Everywhere" (extended 12-inch mix) – 7:43
 "Everywhere" (Cabin Crew club remix) – 6:15
 "Everywhere" (Cabin Crew dub mix) – 6:29
 "Everywhere" (remix) – 7:43

Charts

Niall Horan and Anne-Marie version

"Everywhere" was recorded by Irish singer Niall Horan and English singer Anne-Marie and released on 19 November 2021 for that year's BBC Children in Need appeal, supported by BBC Radio 1 and BBC Radio 2.

Background
The song featured English singers Ed Sheeran on guitar, Griff on the synthesisers and Yungblud on the bass. Fleetwood Mac's vocalist and keyboardist Christine McVie praised the cover saying, "I'm thrilled with this new version of Everywhere and to be part of this year's Children in Need campaign." The song peaked at number 23 on the UK Singles Chart and at number 49 on the Irish Singles Chart.

Charts

Other cover versions
"Everywhere" has been covered by numberous other artists, including Chaka Khan, Paramore, Vampire Weekend, Niall Horan and Anne-Marie, and Smallpools and Emily Vaughn.

References

External links
 "Everywhere" Fleetwood Mac music video version on YouTube

Fleetwood Mac songs
1987 singles
1987 songs
1988 singles
2021 singles
Anne-Marie (singer) songs
Central Station Records singles
Children in Need singles
Niall Horan songs
Number-one singles in Belgium
Song recordings produced by Richard Dashut
Songs written by Christine McVie
Warner Records singles